Thomas Zöller (born 1977) is a German author and player of the Scottish Great Highland Bagpipes, border pipes, and smallpipes. Zöller is a member of the trio As a' Phìob (Out of the Pipes) along with Clemens Bieger and Michael Klevenhaus.

Zöller was educated on a scholarship by the Hessisches Ministerium für Wissenschaft und Kunst (Hessian Ministry of Science and Art) and the Naspa-Stiftung (Naspa Foundation) for initiative and performance; he has been a professional bagpipe player since 1998. He appeared several times in the SWR Fernsehen television, and the daily news television program Tagesthemen.

Zöller is the first German to gain a Bachelor's degree in Scottish music ("piping degree") from the National Piping Centre of the Royal Scottish Academy of Music and Drama in Glasgow, Scotland.

Published works
 Lehrbuch für den mittelalterlichen Dudelsack: Die Sackpfeifen-Fibel. Verlag der Spielleute 2009,

External links
 Official site

References

Living people
Bagpipe players
Alumni of the Royal Conservatoire of Scotland
Players of Scottish smallpipes
German male non-fiction writers
1977 births
21st-century German male writers
21st-century German male musicians
21st-century German non-fiction writers
21st-century German musicians
20th-century German male musicians
20th-century German musicians